Jubilee Hills is an affluent suburban neighbourhood in Western part of Hyderabad, Telangana. It is one of the most expensive commercial and residential locations in India with prime land prices fetching up to 300,000 ($4015) per square yard. A  tract of land in the city was sold for nearly 3,340,000,000 ($66,800,000) in 2005. Rental prices on Road Numbers 36 and 37 range from 100–200 per square foot, among the top commercial rental locales in India.

This suburb is between the wealthy commercial district of Banjara Hills and is located within two kilometres of Hyderabad's IT hub of HITEC City.

History
The idea of Jubilee Hills came about in 1963. In 1967, IAS officer and Padma Shri award winner, Challagalla Narasimham was asked to become the President and "help proper development of the colony". He was thought to be the best person for office since he had planned and developed several colonies in Madras. At the time, Jubilee Hills was a hilly terrain without development. Mr. C Narasimham's family happens to be the first family to have built and occupied the house in Jubilee Hills, making them the first residents. By 1980, 350 houses were built in the area which started the subsequent growth of the area.

Commercial area

Jubilee Hills is home to the Telugu film industry hub of Film Nagar, and some of its studios such as Ramanaidu Studios, Padmalaya Studios and Annapurna Studios are located here. It is also home to most of the Telugu movie industry's actors, business tycoons, and leading politicians.

Jubilee Hills is the political heart of Hyderabad as well as the state of Telangana . The Telangana Rashtra Samithi has recently built a headquarters here and the Telangana Chief Minister KCR resides here.  Large scale political rallies are witnessed in the area occasionally.

Jubilee Hills is in the midst of a commercial boom in addition to its elite residential status Boutiques by leading designers are also located here. Entertainment in the area is provided by various places like SVM@36 where a gaming and bowling alley area is located. It is also home to various hotels & cafes like Taj Mahal Hotel, Testa Rossa, Vacs, Cafe Latte, Barista, Starbucks, and Coffee Day. Corporate headquarters and offices of companies such as Seaways, Gateway Media, Radha Real Estate, Lanco Global Systems, Pricewaterhouse Coopers, ICICI & HDFC Banks are located in the area. A 150-suite 4-star hotel has been constructed on a  site on Commercial Road Number 37 as part of a 30-year government lease. A 120-room luxury boutique hotel, Blue Lotus is coming up on Road Number 36.

Healthcare and education
The Indian Heart Association, an international non-profit organisation focused on expanding South Asian cardiac health awareness is headquartered in Jubilee Hills. Hamstech Institute of Fashion & Interior Design is located here.

The Apollo Health city encompassing Apollo Hospital, Apollo Cancer institute, and other Apollo Subsidiaries located in Jubilee Hills is a major multi-speciality hospital in the state and one of the leading hospitals in emergency care in India. L V Prasad Eye Institute, a leading eye hospital, ETERNESSE the medical clinic (world class and cutting edge treatment) and Indo-American Cancer Institute are located here. Apart from hospitals in health care, Jubilee Hills has also surrounded with best diagnostic centers like Sprint Diagnostics, Best Diagnostics, Vijay Diagnostics and Vijaya Diagnostics are located here. 

Jubilee Hills has numerous schools including P. Obul Reddy Public School (commonly known as PORPS), Bharatiya Vidya Bhavan, Jubilee Hills, Jubilee Hills Public School, as well as Walden's Path, Sreenidhi, Oakridge, and Orchids Schools in the posh commercial Road Number 37. Dr. B. R. Ambedkar Open University is a distance education university of higher education that is also located here. The regional office of the Central Silk Board is in Prashasan Nagar locality in Jubilee Hills. The neighbourhood is a base to a number of small IT startups and BPOs.

Due to be being a central hub of healthcare and education, real estate in Jubilee Hills has experienced a boom in recent years and is the most expensive area to live in Hyderabad.

Places of Worship
The Sita Ramaswamy Temple, Jagannath Temple, and the Peddamma Temple are the most popular in the area, the latter being a fairly new temple.

Media

Jubilee Hills is home to large media houses. Media houses like NTV, YuppTV, TV-9, TV5, T News, RMFT Rainbow Media, Mahaa TV, V6, CVR News, etc. are located in Jubilee Hills and Kavuri Hills. It has become a media hub with a majority of the leading Telugu media houses headquartered here.

Beauty and gyms

Jubilee Hills has some beauty parlours serving the affluent urban class residing here.

Recreation

The KBR National Park and a man-made pond, Lotus Pond, are used by walkers and joggers. Also, there are two other significant natural water bodies in the area: Durgam Cheruvu and Hakimpet Kunta. The former is a major attraction to visitors where boating, trekking, restaurants, and an open-air disco operate. The State Gallery of Fine Arts is located to the northwest or in the region behind the business hub of Road Number 37.

Places for recreation in the region include the Jubilee Hills International Club, the Film Nagar Club, and the Hyderabad Gymkhana. The Jubilee Hills International Club (JHIC) is an exclusive membership only facility including outdoor Olympic-sized pools, indoor and outdoor restaurants, outdoor movie theatres, library, grand halls, playgrounds, fountains, badminton courts, squash courts, basketball courts, cricket courts, billiards hall, nature spaces, and grand lobby. The JHIC is home to the political and economic elites of Telangana . Nightlife in Jubilee Hills got enhanced by Dock 45, Fat Pigeon, Fusion 9, etc.

Peddamma Temple near Jubilee Hills Check Post is a Hindu temple visited by devotees during the local Bonalu festival.

Transport
TSRTC connects Jubilee Hills to the other parts of Hyderabad. The closest MMTS Train station is at HITEC City. State of the art Hyderabad Metro Rail blue line stations are at Road Number 5, Check Post, Peddamma Temple, and near the intersection of Road Numbers 36 and 37 towards Madhapur road. The Telangana government has also announced the building of a world class flyover connecting Madhapur to the Jubilee Hills Check Post. The flyover will come up at the backside of Road Numbers 36 and 37. With this addition, Jubilee Hills is set to be a central transport hub of Hyderabad.

Lotus Pond

References

External links

Neighbourhoods in Hyderabad, India